Maharani Khuman Chanu Manmohini Devi was the third Maharani consort of Tripura through her marriage to Maharaja Birchandra Manikya. She was a contemporary royal photographer who choreographed her self-portraits with the Maharaja and was considered the first Indian woman who mastered the art of photography.

Biography

She was the niece of Maharaja's first wife, Queen Ningthem Chanu Bhanumati. She married Maharaja when she was only 13 years. The Maharaja gave the land at Math Chowmuhani as her share. She also established a temple and a 'mandapa' near the present Iskcon temple at Tripura.

She became a royal photographer under the tutelage of her husband, and she organized photography exhibitions in the palace where both of their photographs were exhibited. The Journal of the Photographic Society of India – May 1890 Issue emphasized their photographs with the title "The Camera Club of the Palace of Agartala." She is regarded as India's first female photographer.

References

Indian queen consorts
People from Tripura
Indian female royalty